Fossum may refer to:

Places 
 Fossum, Akershus, Norway
 Fossum, Oslo, Norway
 Fossum, Telemark, Norway
 Fossum Bridge, Østfold, Norway
 Fossum Township, Minnesota, United States

Other uses 
 Fossum (surname)
 Fossum IF, sports club from Bærum, Norway